Valnai metro station is a station of Mumbai metro. The station is located in an elevated position on New Link Road in West Mumbai. It serves as a station on Mumbai metro line 2A. The station will be inaugurated on January 19, 2023.

The station is owned by the Mumbai Metropolitan Region Development Authority.

History 
Valnai metro station was announced to be built in the second package of line 2A. J. Kumar Infraprojects was awarded the construction work contract for both packages of line 2A in June 2016. The cost of package was estimated at ₹700 crore each. J. Kumar Infraprojects bid below the reserve price. As per the agreement, the company started the construction of Valnai metro station along with the elevated viaducts and other stations of the second package.

Station

structure 
Valnai metro station is an elevated metro station on line 2A of the Mumbai metro. The station has total 3 levels. Station entrances and exits begin or end at the first level or ground level. The second level or mezzanine level houses the station's fare control center, station agents, metro card vending machines, crossovers etc. The third level or final level contains the platforms and rail tracks.

Platform 
Valnai metro station has 2 side platforms. The side platforms are connected to each other through the second level or mezzanine level of the stations.

Power and Signaling System 
Like all other stations and railways of Mumbai metro, Valnai station also uses 25,000 volt AC power system by overhead catenary to operate the trains.

References 

Mumbai Metro stations